Sundarbans is a proposed district in presidency division, West Bengal. The district will be formed by dividing the South 24 Parganas district.

History 
On 1 August 2022, Chief Minister of West Bengal Mamata Banerjee declared about the creation of Sundarbans district craving out from South 24 Parganas district.

Education

College
 Bankim Sardar College
 Jibantala Rokeya Mahavidyalaya 
 Sukanta College
 Sundarban Hazi Desarat College

Health facilities 
The main hospital of Sundarbans district is Canning subdivisional hospital. It consists of 100 beds. Besides, this district has three rural hospitals with 30 beds each: Matherdighi Rural Hospital, Basanti Rural Hospital, and Gosaba Rural Hospital.

References

Proposed districts of West Bengal